Problepsis similinotata is a moth of the  family Geometridae. It is found in the Democratic Republic of Congo, Guinea, Ivory Coast, Sierra Leone, Gambia and Uganda.

References

Moths described in 1917
Scopulini
Insects of the Democratic Republic of the Congo
Moths of Africa